Maxime Marin (born 16 July 1992) is a Canadian male badminton player. In 2015, he competed at the Summer Universiade in Gwangju, South Korea. In 2016, he won the gold medal in mixed team event at the Pan Am Badminton Championships. In the individual event, he won the silver medal in men's doubles event partnered with Phillipe Gaumond.

Achievements

Pan Am Championships
Men's Doubles

References

External links 
 

Living people
1992 births
Canadian male badminton players